Herbert Pohl (18 September 1916 – 21 November 2010) was a German international footballer.

References

1916 births
2010 deaths
Association football midfielders
German footballers
Germany international footballers